The 1941 Dunbartonshire by-election was held on 27 February 1941.  The by-election was held due to the appointment as sheriff substitute of the incumbent Labour MP, Thomas Cassells.  It was won by the Labour candidate Adam McKinlay.

Because of the wartime truce his only opponent was a Communist, who had a relatively strong vote, although the constituency did include the Vale of Leven, a "little Moscow".  It took place before the Soviet Union entered the war when the Communist Party changed its line.

References

1941 in Scotland
1940s elections in Scotland
Politics of the Dunbartonshire
1941 elections in the United Kingdom
By-elections to the Parliament of the United Kingdom in Scottish constituencies